PESA Tramicus 121N is a tram produced by the Polish company PESA in Bydgoszcz. It has a modern, fully low-floor design. The 121N trams are currently used only in Elbląg and are operated by ZKM Elbląg. Currently 6 vehicles of this type are in service.

Production

External links
  Technical data from the producer

Tram vehicles of Poland
PESA trams